Russell West Glacier is a glacier, 11 nautical miles (20 km) long and 4 nautical miles (7 km) wide, which lies immediately north of Detroit Plateau and flows from Mount Canicula, Verdikal Gap and Trajan Gate westward into Bone Bay on the north side of Trinity Peninsula. This glacier together with Russell East Glacier, which flows eastward into Prince Gustav Channel on the south side of Trinity Peninsula, form a through glacier across the north part of Antarctic Peninsula. It was first surveyed in 1946 by the Falkland Islands Dependencies Survey (FIDS). Named by the United Kingdom Antarctic Place-Names Committee (UK-APC) for V.I. Russell, surveyor and leader of the FIDS base at Hope Bay in 1946.

See also
 Allen Knoll
 List of glaciers in the Antarctic
 Glaciology

Map
 Trinity Peninsula. Scale 1:250000 topographic map.  Institut für Angewandte Geodäsie and British Antarctic Survey, 1996.

References
 

Glaciers of Trinity Peninsula